Westwood (known as "The Hub of the Pascack Valley") is a borough in Bergen County, in the U.S. state of New Jersey.  Westwood is part of the New York metropolitan area. Many of its residents regularly commute to New York City for work and leisure, many using public transportation. As of the 2020 United States census, the borough's population was 11,282, an increase of 374 (+3.4%) from the 2010 census count of 10,908, which in turn reflected a decline of 91 (−0.8%) from the 10,999 counted in the 2000 census.

Westwood was officially incorporated as a borough on May 8, 1894, from portions of Washington Township, early during the "Boroughitis" phenomenon then sweeping through Bergen County, in which 26 boroughs were formed in the county in 1894 alone. Isaac D. Bogert served as the first mayor of the Borough. In April 1909, Westwood was enlarged through the annexation of the "Old Hook" section of the borough of Emerson, and on September 24, 1957, portions of the borough were exchanged with Emerson.

History
The Lenni-Lenape Native Americans inhabited this part of the state and shared it with the transient hunters and trappers until the permanent settlers began to enter in mid-18th century. In the early 19th century, the area that would later become Westwood was within the larger political boundaries of Harrington Township, which had been established by royal charter in 1775. In 1840, the western half of Harrington Township became Washington Township, with the Hackensack River as the dividing line. Washington Township was an agrarian region with isolated farmsteads.  Early families, including the Hoppers and Ackermans, are buried at the Old Hook Cemetery.  An 18th-century mill was situated at the dammed stream near the intersection of today's Mill Street and First Avenue.  This mill was on an important east west pathway and was the first on Musquapsink Brook. The mill was largely destroyed after a fire set by an arsonist and was dismantled in 1910.

A brief description of Washington Township written in 1844 described it as a township with six stores, four schools for 135 students, six grist mills, and 14 saw mills.

The first wave of concentrated development took place as the result of the coming of the Hackensack and New York Railroad in 1870, which followed the route of today's Pascack Valley Line.  On March 5, 1870, service began between Westwood and New York City (via Jersey City and a ferry ride).  Several small hotels were built near the depot, and in 1872 several houses in the latest European-influenced styles began to be built along Centre Avenue. Old maps show that growth occurred simultaneously on the land both to the east and west of the tracks.  The commercial buildings included lumber and coal sheds, stores, and a bakery.  There was a chapel on the corner of Third and Park Avenues.  The triangular park that has played an important role as a place of community gatherings is also shown on the 1876 map.

By the 1880s, Westwood had four factories, several distilleries, a new school, a laundry and grocery store, and a new Reformed Church.  In 1890, following a meeting of interested residents, those favoring the incorporation of Westwood as an independent borough conducted a petition drive. In 1894, Westwood separated from Washington Township and became an independent borough. Elected as the borough's first mayor was Isaac D. Bogert.

In 1899, a water plant constructed by Cornelius S. DeBraun provided service to the houses that had been built along the borough's newly laid streets. By the time of the 1905 New Jersey Census, there were 234 dwellings housing a population of 1,044.  

Lincoln High School was constructed around the turn of the 20th century, which also saw the introduction of electricity, telephones, and automobiles to the town. Underwood & Underwood Stereoscope Company opened a plant during the first decades of the 20th century, and many congregations established their first chapels, which were replaced in later years as the congregations grew in numbers and wealth. Following a typical pattern of development throughout the 20th century, the results are a mature railroad suburb almost covered with housing units, commercial, municipal and ecclesiastical buildings.  The borough still retains the open space of the triangular park at its center.

Geography

According to the United States Census Bureau, the borough had a total area of 2.30 square miles (5.95 km2), including 2.26 square miles (5.85 km2) of land and 0.04 square miles (0.10 km2) of water (1.74%).

The borough borders the Bergen County municipalities of Emerson, Hillsdale, River Vale And Washington Township.

Demographics

2010 census

The Census Bureau's 2006–2010 American Community Survey showed that (in 2010 inflation-adjusted dollars) median household income was $79,133 (with a margin of error of +/− $5,195) and the median family income was $107,966 (+/− $10,189). Males had a median income of $70,598 (+/− $14,566) versus $52,721 (+/− $10,753) for females. The per capita income for the borough was $40,839 (+/− $2,990). About 1.8% of families and 2.8% of the population were below the poverty line, including 1.9% of those under age 18 and 4.7% of those age 65 or over.

Same-sex couples headed 21 households in 2010, an increase from the 19 counted in 2000.

2000 census
As of the 2000 United States census, there were 10,999 people, 4,485 households, and 2,879 families residing in the borough. The population density was 4,745.0 people per square mile (1,830.5/km2). There were 4,610 housing units at an average density of 1,988.8 per square mile (767.2/km2). The racial makeup of the borough was 86.60% White, 4.39% Asian, 5.72% African American, 1.67% from other races, 0.14% Native American, 0.01% Pacific Islander, and 1.47% from two or more races. Hispanic or Latino of any race were 6.00% of the population.

There were 4,485 households, out of which 28.4% had children under the age of 18 living with them, 53.3% were married couples living together, 8.0% had a female householder with no husband present, and 35.8% were non-families. 31.1% of all households were made up of individuals, and 13.4% had someone living alone who was 65 years of age or older. The average household size was 2.42 and the average family size was 3.08.

In the borough the population was spread out, with 21.5% under the age of 18, 5.6% from 18 to 24, 33.6% from 25 to 44, 23.4% from 45 to 64, and 15.9% who were 65 years of age or older. The median age was 39 years. For every 100 females, there were 90.3 males. For every 100 females age 18 and over, there were 85.1 males.

The median income for a household in the borough was $59,868, and the median income for a family was $77,105. Males had a median income of $50,800 versus $42,459 for females. The per capita income for the borough was $32,083. About 1.8% of families and 4.4% of the population were below the poverty line, including 2.8% of those under age 18 and 8.7% of those age 65 or over.

Government

Local government
Westwood is governed under the Borough form of New Jersey municipal government, one of 218 municipalities (of the 564) statewide that use this form, the state's most common form of government. The governing body is comprised of a mayor directly elected by the voters and a Borough Council. The Mayor serves a four-year term of office, and the Borough Council is comprised of six members who serve three-year terms of office on a staggered basis, with two seats coming up for election each year in a three-year cycle.  The Borough form of government used by Westwood is a "weak mayor / strong council" government in which council members act as the legislative body with the mayor presiding at meetings and voting only in the event of a tie. The mayor can veto ordinances subject to an override by a two-thirds majority vote of the council. The mayor makes committee and liaison assignments for council members, and most appointments are made by the mayor with the advice and consent of the council.

, the Mayor of Westwood is Republican Raymond Arroyo, whose term of office ends December 31, 2023. Members of the Westwood Borough Council are Council President Beth Dell (R, 2025), Robert Bicocchi (R, 2025), Erin Collins (D, 2023), Anthony Greco (R, 2024), Cheryl Hodges (R, 2024), and Christopher Montana (R, 2023).

In January 2020, Cheryl Hodges was selected from three candidates nominated by the Republican municipal committee to fill the seat expiring in December 2021 that became vacant when Raymond Arroyo took office as mayor; Hodges served on an interim basis until the November 2020 general election, when voters selected her to serve the balance of the term of office.

In May 2018, the Borough Council selected Alyssa Dawson from a list of three candidates nominated by the Republican municipal committee to fill the vacant seat of Peter Grefrath expiring in December 2018.

In September 2015, the Borough Council selected Beth Dell from a list of three candidates nominated by the Republican municipal committee to fill the vacant seat of Robert Miller expiring in December 2016. In announcing his resignation, Miller cited commitments to his family, and concerns about the impact of extended service by elected officials.

Federal, state and county representation
Westwood is located in the 5th Congressional District and is part of New Jersey's 39th state legislative district.

Politics
As of March 2011, there were a total of 6,847 registered voters in Westwood, of which 1,805 (26.4% vs. 31.7% countywide) were registered as Democrats, 1,986 (29.0% vs. 21.1%) were registered as Republicans and 3,049 (44.5% vs. 47.1%) were registered as Unaffiliated. There were 7 voters registered as Libertarians or Greens. Among the borough's 2010 Census population, 62.8% (vs. 57.1% in Bergen County) were registered to vote, including 80.4% of those ages 18 and over (vs. 73.7% countywide).

In the 2016 presidential election, Democrat Hillary Clinton received 2,877 votes (50.6% vs. 54.8% countywide), ahead of Republican Donald Trump with 2,598 votes (45.7% vs. 41.6%) and other candidates with 214 votes (3.8% vs. 3.0%), among the 5,742 ballots cast by the borough's 7,517 registered voters, for a turnout of 76.4% (vs. 72.5% in Bergen County). In the 2012 presidential election, Democrat Barack Obama received 2,701 votes (50.4% vs. 54.8% countywide), ahead of Republican Mitt Romney with 2,564 votes (47.9% vs. 43.5%) and other candidates with 49 votes (0.9% vs. 0.9%), among the 5,355 ballots cast by the borough's 7,151 registered voters, for a turnout of 74.9% (vs. 70.4% in Bergen County). In the 2008 presidential election, Democrat Barack Obama received 2,915 votes (51.5% vs. 53.9% countywide), ahead of Republican John McCain with 2,657 votes (46.9% vs. 44.5%) and other candidates with 47 votes (0.8% vs. 0.8%), among the 5,664 ballots cast by the borough's 7,130 registered voters, for a turnout of 79.4% (vs. 76.8% in Bergen County). In the 2004 presidential election, Republican George W. Bush received 2,795 votes (51.4% vs. 47.2% countywide), ahead of Democrat John Kerry with 2,576 votes (47.4% vs. 51.7%) and other candidates with 47 votes (0.9% vs. 0.7%), among the 5,436 ballots cast by the borough's 6,837 registered voters, for a turnout of 79.5% (vs. 76.9% in the whole county).

In the 2013 gubernatorial election, Republican Chris Christie received 64.3% of the vote (2,134 cast), ahead of Democrat Barbara Buono with 34.7% (1,150 votes), and other candidates with 1.0% (34 votes), among the 3,404 ballots cast by the borough's 6,830 registered voters (86 ballots were spoiled), for a turnout of 49.8%. In the 2009 gubernatorial election, Republican Chris Christie received 4,288 votes (62.9% vs. 45.8% countywide), ahead of Democrat Jon Corzine with 2,104 votes (30.8% vs. 48.0%), Independent Chris Daggett with 352 votes (5.2% vs. 4.7%) and other candidates with 26 votes (0.4% vs. 0.5%), among the 6,822 ballots cast by the borough's 12,051 registered voters, yielding a 56.6% turnout (vs. 50.0% in the county).

Emergency services
Westwood has a police department founded in September 1894, months after the borough was established, with the appointment by Mayor Bogert of two marshals; The first permanent officer was hired in 1921. The department is located in the municipal building.

Westwood has its own volunteer fire department. It was established in 1894. The station is home to Engine 12, Engine 1,Truck 1,Rescue 1, Utility 1, and Marine 1. The department responds to over 300 calls a year. It is located at 93 Center Ave. There is a Chief, Deputy Chief, 2 captains and 4 Lieutenants, approx. 60 regular firefighters, 10 Probationary Firemen, and 10 Cadets led by a Cadet Captain.

Westwood also has a separate volunteer ambulance corps that was formed in 1935, located at borough hall.

Education
Students in public school for kindergarten through twelfth grade attend the Westwood Regional School District, a comprehensive regional school district serving both Westwood and Washington Township. The district is the county's only regional district serving grades K–12. As of the 2020–21 school year, the district, comprised of six schools, had an enrollment of 2,796 students and 256.8 classroom teachers (on an FTE basis), for a student–teacher ratio of 10.9:1. Schools in the district (with 2020–21 enrollment data from the National Center for Education Statistics) are 
Berkeley Avenue Elementary School with 289 students in grades K–5, 
Brookside Elementary School with 398 students in grades K–5, 
Jessie F. George Elementary School with 274 students in grades K–5, 
Washington Elementary School with 316 students in grades K–5, 
Westwood Regional Middle School with 640 students in grades 6–8 and 
Westwood Regional High School with 843 students in grades 9–12.

For the 2010–2011 school year, Ketler Elementary School, which had served K–4, was shifted to become Westwood Regional Middle School for grades 6 and 7, while the other elementary schools would all serve K through 5, and the high school was shifted to grades 8–12 (from 7–12).

Public school students from the borough, and all of Bergen County, are eligible to attend the secondary education programs offered by the Bergen County Technical Schools, which include the Bergen County Academies in Hackensack, and the Bergen Tech campus in Teterboro or Paramus. The district offers programs on a shared-time or full-time basis, with admission based on a selective application process and tuition covered by the student's home school district.

Zion Lutheran School, adjacent the eponymous church founded in 1905, is a private school for students in Kindergarten through eighth grade.

Infrastructure

Transportation

Roads and highways

The most significant roads passing directly through Westwood are County Route 503 (Kinderkamack Road) and County Route 502. The closest limited-access highway is the Garden State Parkway in neighboring Washington Township, where Exit 168 links CR 502 to the borough.

Public transportation
Westwood is served by NJ Transit at the Westwood train station, located at Broadway and Westwood Avenue. The Pascack Valley Line runs north–south to Hoboken Terminal with connections via the Secaucus Junction transfer station to New York Penn Station and to other NJ Transit rail service. Connections are available at Hoboken Terminal to other NJ Transit rail lines, the PATH train at the Hoboken PATH station, New York Waterways ferry service to the World Financial Center and other destinations and Hudson-Bergen Light Rail service.

NJ Transit bus route 165 serves Westwood with service to the Port Authority Bus Terminal in Midtown Manhattan. Westwood is the terminus for bus route 165.

Rockland Coaches offers service to the Port Authority Bus Terminal on routes 11T/11AT, 14ET and 46/47. Saddle River Tours / Ameribus provides service to the George Washington Bridge Bus Station on route 11C.

Healthcare
Pascack Valley Hospital (PVH), a 291-bed hospital located at 250 Old Hook Road, filed for bankruptcy on September 24, 2007, and shut down on November 21, 2007. On October 1, 2008, Hackensack University Medical Center opened Hackensack University Medical Center at Pascack Valley as a satellite emergency department. As of 2013, the facility has been expanded to include 128 patient beds, all in single rooms.

Shopping and entertainment

Downtown Westwood is a regional hub that offers many options for shopping and dining. The Westwood Plaza is an outdoor shopping mall that has a Kmart and other stores and restaurants. , the Westwood location is one of the last three operating Kmart stores in the United States.Westwood has a movie theater located on Center Avenue that is open seven days a week until midnight.

The Fritz Deitl Ice Rink, which opened in 1958, is home to AM3 Hockey Academy and offers open ice sessions, figure skating lessons, skating school, birthday party rentals, and Stick Time open hockey.

Every Saturday, from May through November, there is a Farmer's Market held in the parking lot of the Knights of Columbus on Crest Street.

In the summer, there are multiple concerts in the park where anyone can bring chairs or blankets, and watch the movie projected on the back of the train station.

Westwood also has a Community Center that is home to the Recreation Department where children and adults can get participate in sports and other activities.

Annual events
Each December, Westwood holds its own holiday parade called "Home for the Holidays". Participants of the parade include the Park Ridge High School marching band, The Emerson High School marching band, and many more. The parade ends with Santa Claus riding on top of one of the fire trucks. Afterwards, there is a tree and candle lighting with hot foods included.

Downtown Westwood has a sidewalk sale held every summer. People can shop indoors or outdoors during this event. There are also fun activities and games included.

Notable people

People who were born in, residents of, or otherwise closely associated with Westwood include:

 Warren Bennis (1925–2014), scholar, organizational consultant and author, widely regarded as a pioneer of the contemporary field of leadership studies
 F. Herbert Bormann (1922–2012), scientist who helped discover the ecological impact of acid rain
 Rob Delaney (born 1984), Major League Baseball pitcher who plays for the Minnesota Twins and Tampa Bay Rays
 Russell Dermond (1936–2015), sprint canoer who competed in the 1956 and 1960 Olympics
 Robert Dow (born 1945), fencer who competed in the team sabre event at the 1972 Summer Olympics
 James Gandolfini (1961–2013), actor known for playing Tony Soprano on HBO's The Sopranos, raised in nearby Park Ridge
 Jason Knapp (born 1990), professional baseball pitcher
 Tommy La Stella (born 1989), second baseman for the Chicago Cubs
 Robert Sean Leonard (born 1969), actor best known for his roles in House and Dead Poets Society
 Vicente Luque (born 1991), mixed martial artist who competes in Ultimate Fighting Championship as a welterweight
 Harold Medina (1888–1990), lawyer, teacher and judge who is most noted for hearing landmark cases of conspiracy and treason
 Carlotta Monterey (1888–1970), stage and film actress who was the third and final wife of playwright Eugene O'Neill
 James O'Keefe (born 1984), activist-filmmaker who targeted ACORN
 Jeff Phillips (born 1968), fitness trainer and former actor best known for his work in Guiding Light, As the World Turns and the 1996 film Independence Day
 Elizabeth Randall, Bergen County Clerk and former member of the New Jersey General Assembly
 Harry Randall Jr. (1927–2013), politician who served in the New Jersey General Assembly from 1962 to 1966 and from 1968 to 1970, after which he served as a member of the Bergen County Board of Chosen Freeholders
 Katie Sagona (born 1989), model and actress who appeared in You've Got Mail and Grumpier Old Men
 Kevin Sampson (born 1981), tackle for the Kansas City Chiefs
 Frank Saul (1924–2019), National Basketball Association player
 Kyle Scatliffe (born 1986), stage actor best known for playing Enjolras in the 2014 Broadway revival of Les Misérables, and Harpo in the 2015 Broadway Revival of The Color Purple

See also
Cunningham v. Cunningham (1912)

References

Sources 

 Municipal Incorporations of the State of New Jersey (according to Counties) prepared by the Division of Local Government, Department of the Treasury (New Jersey); December 1, 1958.
 Clayton, W. Woodford; and Nelson, William. History of Bergen and Passaic Counties, New Jersey, with Biographical Sketches of Many of its Pioneers and Prominent Men., Philadelphia: Everts and Peck, 1882.
 Harvey, Cornelius Burnham (ed.), Genealogical History of Hudson and Bergen Counties, New Jersey. New York: New Jersey Genealogical Publishing Co., 1900.
 Pelegrino, Michael. Westwood, Images of America Series, Arcadia Publishing, 2004. 
 Van Valen, James M. History of Bergen County, New Jersey. New York: New Jersey Publishing and Engraving Co., 1900.
 Westervelt, Frances A. (Frances Augusta), 1858–1942, History of Bergen County, New Jersey, 1630–1923, Lewis Historical Publishing Company, 1923.

External links

 Westwood Regional School District
 
 Westwood Chamber of Commerce website
 Greater Pascack Valley Chamber of Commerce website
 Fritz Dietl Ice Skating Rink
 RinkAtlas listing for Fritz Dietl Ice Skating Rink

 
1894 establishments in New Jersey
Borough form of New Jersey government
Boroughs in Bergen County, New Jersey
Pascack Valley
Populated places established in 1894